Hälsoresan – En smal film av stor vikt is a Swedish comedy film, which was released to cinemas on 25 December 1999 and directed by Lasse Åberg.

Synopsis 
The film is about the health resort Granhedsgården in Dalarna, Sweden, and they have a problem. They don't have many guests at all and something must be done. At the same time, Stig-Helmer is a little depressed after his Scottish girlfriend Fiona left him, and so he lives on junk food. His best friend Ole invites him to come along to the health resort Granhedsgården. Now, the craziness begins.

Cast 
Lasse Åberg as Stig-Helmer Olsson
Jon Skolmen as Ole Bramserud
Magnus Härenstam as Dr. Levander
Barbro Hiort af Ornäs as Stig-Helmer's mother

References

External links 

1999 films
1999 comedy films
Films directed by Lasse Åberg
Swedish comedy films
1990s Swedish-language films
Films set in Dalarna
1990s Swedish films